Loving is an American television soap opera that ran on ABC from June 26, 1983, to November 10, 1995, for a total of 3,169 episodes. The serial, set in the fictional town of Corinth, Pennsylvania, was co-created by Agnes Nixon and former actor Douglas Marland.

Loving premiered on June 26, 1983 with a two-hour primetime movie and, on the next day, debuted as a half-hour weekday soap opera.

On July 4, 1995, ABC officially canceled Loving due to low ratings, and its final episode aired on November 10, 1995. On November 13, 1995, the following Monday, ABC replaced Loving with its spin-off The City, which ran until March 28, 1997.

History 
With the established and successful ABC daytime soap operas veering into a new trend of youth orientation and storylines with more action and adventure, soap creator Agnes Nixon and actor/writer Douglas Marland sought to create a new serial that would be introduced as a traditional, classic soap opera for the 1980s. Romance would be the show's key centerpiece; its original working title was Love Without End. By early 1983, the new creation was fully developed as Loving, with a cast set for both a primetime premiere and a weekday run.

Loving premiered on June 26, 1983 as a two-hour primetime movie. It starred much of the original cast and featured film actors Lloyd Bridges and Geraldine Page. Set in the fictional town of Corinth, Pennsylvania, the early years of the show revolved around the blue-collar Donovans and the blue-blood Aldens. Major social issues such as incest, alcoholism, and post-traumatic stress syndrome of Vietnam veterans were covered. Marland and Nixon left the series after a few years and in spite of ABC's bumping down Ryan's Hope to give Loving a choice timeslot, and cast additions of such popular All My Children stars as Debbi Morgan and Jean LeClerc, the ratings remained low throughout the show's run. Loving suffered from a constant revolving door of writers and producers, leading to questionable story moments such as a heroine's addiction to cough syrup and one character's selling his soul to the Devil. Circumstances became so desperate in the early 1990s that, in order to keep the show afloat, ABC assigned its own programming executives, network executive Haidee Granger and later, Vice President of Daytime Programming JoAnn Emmerich, to serve as executive producers. Despite its frequent subpar ratings, on June 26, 1993, Loving celebrated its 10th Anniversary on ABC.

Long-running characters included Ava Rescott (played by Patty Lotz, 1983–1984; Roya Megnot, 1984–1988; Lisa Peluso, 1988–1995), a schemer whose adventures ranged from stuffing a pillow in her dress to simulate pregnancy to being kidnapped at Universal Studios to being menaced by her lover's identical twin. Other longtime favorites included Stacey Donovan Forbes (portrayed by Lauren-Marie Taylor, the only continuously running original cast member), who was killed off via a poisoned powder puff in summer 1995; boarding house owner Kate Rescott (Nada Rowand), whose tenants often included teen and young adult characters in trouble, or in numerous romantic entanglements; and Gwyneth Alden (played for the majority of the run by Christine Tudor), the long-suffering matriarch who never stopped loving her roguish ex, Clay, or her mentally disturbed children, Trisha and Curtis.

In early 1995, ABC Daytime planned to cancel the show and asked new head writers James Harmon Brown and Barbara Esensten to find a way to salvage a few components of the series. The writers embarked upon the show's last big storyline, the Corinth serial killer. Stacey, Clay, Curtis, Cabot, Isabelle, and Jeremy lost their lives, culminating in the revelation that an insane Gwyn had murdered most of her friends and family in a bid to "make their pain go away." Gwyn then injected herself with poison before the police could take her into custody. Loving characters Ally, Alex, Angie, Buck, Frankie, Jacob, Steffi, Jocelyn, Richard, Tony, Danny and Tess moved to New York City's SoHo District and began a new series, The City, which would run until March 1997.

In August 2013, the serial killer storyline was revisited on General Hospital  as Luke Spencer and Holly Sutton found their way into the abandoned Alden mansion, in pursuit of an adversary who was hiding out in Corinth. Framed photographs of Gwyneth, Trisha and Cabot Alden could be seen, as Luke and Holly recounted the story of "The Loving Murders". Holly ruminated upon Gwyn's rationale for being the killer as being her need to "spare the people she loved from their pain." Following this, Luke found his ex-wife Laura tied up in the Alden family basement.

Ratings history

Although Loving had low ratings throughout its history, its first few years were relatively encouraging. In its debut year (1983), it finished in 11th place and 3.9, above the then ailing soaps The Edge of Night and Search for Tomorrow. 1984 saw the show's ratings climb to a fairly comfortable 10th place and 4.1, holding that position for the 1985-1986 television season with 4.2. A change in timeslot, with Loving occupying the slot previously held by Ryan's Hope, was a major factor in ratings improvement (albeit having the opposite effect on Ryan's Hope).

The slow but steady ratings growth was not sustained in the long run. Loving fell back to 11th place, hitting last place for the first time, in early 1989 (between the January series finale of Ryan's Hope and the March premiere of NBC's Generations). In 1990, the show ranked 11th place as well. After Santa Barbara went off the air in January 1993, Loving, according to television historian Alex McNeil, "was consistently the lowest rated of the ten network daytime soaps."

When it originally premiered, the show aired at 11:30 AM ET/10:30 AM CT/MT/PT. On October 8, 1984, the show was moved to the later 12:30 PM/11:30 AM timeslot, bumping Ryan's Hope up to Noon/11:00. This caused Ryan's Hope ratings to plummet because many East Coast ABC stations pre-empted network programming at Noon for local news. Some affiliates, such as WSB-TV in Atlanta, chose to keep Ryan's Hope at 12:30, never airing Loving until after Ryan's Hope cancellation in 1989.  Despite airing in the 12:30 timeslot, Loving never achieved the ratings Ryan's Hope had during its glory years.  In the Central, Mountain and Pacific time zones, Loving was often pre-empted at 11:30 for local newscasts, airing on a one-day delay earlier in the morning or not at all.

On August 17, 1992, ABC officially stopped programming the Noon/11:00am CT timeslot. Loving was then made available to affiliates at Noon/11 or 12:30/11:30.  Some affiliates in the Central and Pacific Time Zones moved Loving to 11:00 AM to air local newscasts at 11:30. Despite the time slot changes on some affiliates, the national ratings for the show never improved. In fact, the show's national ratings were never strong enough to climb above tenth place. However, Loving did beat the genre's top-rated program, CBS' The Young and the Restless, in markets such as New York City, Los Angeles, Chicago, and Philadelphia, which were home to four of ABC's owned-and-operated stations, despite only competing with the first half hour of The Young and the Restless.

The show had a short two-year run in the early years of UK satellite and cable channel Sky One, starting in February 1989. Loving aired in an afternoon slot, Monday to Friday at 14:45, later moved to 14:30, before being cancelled and replaced by Santa Barbara in February 1991.

Cast and crew

Cast

Executive producers

Producers

Associate producers

Coordinating producers

Head writers

Awards and nominations

Daytime Emmy Award wins

Drama performer categories

Other categories
 1988 "Outstanding Achievement in Lighting Direction for a Drama Series"

Other awards
 Writers Guild of America Award (1994)

International broadcasts
The show was broadcast in France under the title Amoureusement vôtre (Lovingly Yours), in Croatia as Ljubav, in Germany as Loving - Wege der Liebe, in Greece as "Έρωτες έρωτες έρωτες" ("Love, Love, Love")  and in Italy as Quando si ama (When you're in love). In South Africa as "Loving", broadcast on Mnet was on open time, weekdays.

References

External links 
 
Entertainment Weekly: 1994

1983 American television series debuts
1995 American television series endings
1980s American drama television series
1990s American drama television series
1980s television soap operas
1990s television soap operas
American television soap operas
American Broadcasting Company original programming
English-language television shows
Television shows set in Pennsylvania
Television series created by Agnes Nixon
Television series by Disney–ABC Domestic Television
American Broadcasting Company network soap operas